The Nauchandi Mela is an annual fair held at Nauchandi Ground in Meerut. The fair stretches for about a month and is organized by the Municipal Corporation of Meerut. It generally starts from the second Sunday after Holi. The main exhibits are the artistic and religious rituals followed in rustic Uttar Pradesh. The fair witness more than 50,000 visitors every year. The Indian Railways' Nauchandi Express train is named after this fair from Meerut to the state capital Lucknow.

History
The fair has a prominent history dating back several hundred years. It started in the year 1672 AD as a one-day cattle trading fair. The fair has been held every year, excluding 1858, the year after 1857 revolt, which started from Meerut. Since then cattle trading has been replaced by a number of other activities. The fair was postponed in 2020 due to the Coronavirus pandemic.

Fair
The fair feature shops for Lucknow's Chikan work, Moradabad's brassware, Varanasi's carpets, rugs and silk sarees, Agra's footwear, Meerut's leather items, etc. Meerut's own products like sports goods, scissors, gajaks, nan-khatai are also sold. Giant rides, wheels, circus and various other recreational arenas where artists perform stunts, remains a big attraction of the fair.

Gallery

References

External links

Meerut
Hinduism in Uttar Pradesh
Culture of Uttar Pradesh
Fairs in India
Tourist attractions in Meerut district